Artis J. McCampbell (born March 11, 1953) is an American politician. He is a member of the Alabama House of Representatives from the 71st District, serving since 2006. He is a member of the Democratic party.

References

Living people
Democratic Party members of the Alabama House of Representatives
1953 births
People from Greene County, Alabama
21st-century American politicians